The tūī (Prosthemadera novaeseelandiae) is a boisterous medium-sized bird native to New Zealand. It is blue, green, and bronze colored with a distinctive white throat tuft. It is an endemic passerine bird of New Zealand, and the only species in the genus Prosthemadera. It is one of the largest species in the diverse Australasian honeyeater family Meliphagidae, and one of two living species of that family found in New Zealand, the other being the New Zealand bellbird (Anthornis melanura). The tūī has a wide distribution in the archipelago, ranging from the subtropical Kermadec Islands to the sub-Antarctic Auckland Islands, as well as the main islands.

Taxonomy 

The bird's name comes from the Māori language. The plural is tūī in modern New Zealand English, or ngā tūī in Māori usage; some speakers still use the '-s' suffix to produce the Anglicised form tūīs to indicate plurality, but this practice is becoming less common. For many years the prevailing spelling was tui without the macrons that indicate long vowels, but spelling Māori loanwords with macrons is now common in New Zealand English. The International Ornithologists' Union (IOC), which has a policy of not using accents, lists Tui as the bird's English name. Early European colonists called it the parson bird or mockingbird but these names are no longer used. 

The closest living relative to tūī is the New Zealand bellbird; genetic analysis indicates its ancestor diverged from a lineage that gave rise to the New Zealand and Chatham bellbirds around 5 million years ago. The cladogram below shows this relationship:

Description 
The tūī is a large honeyeater,  in length. The Chatham Islands subspecies is larger on average than the nominate subspecies, and heavier. Males tend to be heavier than females.

At first glance the bird appears completely black except for a small tuft of white feathers at its neck and a small white wing patch, causing it to resemble a parson in clerical attire. On closer inspection (see image) it can be seen that tūī have brown feathers on the back and flanks, a multicoloured iridescent sheen that varies with the angle from which the light strikes them, and a dusting of small, white-shafted feathers on the back and sides of the neck that produce a lacy collar.

Distribution and habitat 
Tūī are native to New Zealand, and are found throughout the country, particularly the North Island, the west and south coasts of the South Island, Stewart Island/Rakiura and the Chatham Islands, where an endangered sub-species particular to these islands exists. Other populations live on Raoul Island in the Kermadecs, and in the Auckland Islands (where, with the New Zealand bellbird, it is the most southerly species of honeyeater). Traditionally, Māori ate tūī that had been preserved in calabashes or gourds. Populations have declined considerably since European settlement, mainly as a result of widespread habitat destruction and predation by mammalian invasive species.

Nonetheless, the species is considered secure and has made recoveries in some areas, particularly after removal of livestock has allowed vegetation to recover. Predation by introduced species remains a threat, particularly brushtail possums (which eat eggs and chicks), cats, stoats, the common myna (which competes with tūī for food and sometimes takes eggs), blackbirds, and rats.

Tūī prefer broadleaf forests at low altitudes, although have been recorded up to 1500 metres. They will tolerate quite small remnant patches, regrowth, exotic plantations and well-vegetated suburbs. They are one of the most common birds found in urban Wellington. Tūī are usually seen singly, in pairs, or in small family groups, but will congregate in large numbers at suitable food sources, often in company with silvereyes, bellbirds, or kererū (New Zealand pigeon) in any combination. Generally, when interspecific competition for the same food resources among New Zealand's two species of honeyeater occurs, there is a hierarchy with the tūī at the top and bellbirds subordinate. The latter are thus frequently chased off by tūī at a food source such as a flowering flax plant.

Behaviour and ecology 

Male tūī can be extremely aggressive, chasing all other birds (large and small) from their territory with loud flapping and sounds akin to rude human speech. This is especially true of other tūī when possession of a favoured feeding tree is impinged. Birds will often erect their body feathers in order to appear larger in an attempt to intimidate a rival. They have even been known to mob harriers and magpies.

The powered flight of tūī is quite loud as they have developed short wide wings, giving excellent maneuverability in the dense forest they prefer, but requiring rapid flapping. They can be seen to perform a mating display of rising at speed in a vertical climb in clear air, before stalling and dropping into a powered dive, then repeating. Much of this behaviour is more notable during the breeding season of early spring—September and October. Females alone build nests of twigs, grasses and mosses.

Feeding 

Nectar is the normal diet but fruit and insects are frequently eaten, and pollen and seeds more occasionally. Particularly popular is the New Zealand flax, whose nectar sometimes ferments, resulting in the tūī flying in a fashion that suggests that they might be drunk. They are the main pollinators of flax, kōwhai, kaka beak and some other plants. Note that the flowers of the three plants mentioned are similar in shape to the tūī's beak—a vivid example of mutualistic coevolution.

Songs and calls 
Tūī are known for their noisy, unusual, sometimes soulful calls, different for each individual, that combine bellbird-like notes with clicks, cackles, timber-like creaks and groans, and wheezing sounds. 

Tūī have a complex variety of songs and calls, much like parrots. They also resemble parrots in their ability to clearly imitate human speech, and were trained by Māori to replicate complex speech. They also re-create sounds like glass shattering, car alarms, classical music and advertising jingles.

All birds have a sound producing organ called a syrinx, which is typically controlled with two sets of muscles. Songbirds or passerines like tūī have nine pairs of muscles giving them the ability to produce much more complex vocalisations, and they can be seen to be very physically involved with their songs. Their dual voice box allow tūī to make two sounds at the same time. Tūī song also exhibits geographical, microgeographic, seasonal, sex and individual variation.

Some of the wide range of tūī sounds are beyond the human register. Watching a tūī sing, one can observe gaps in audible sound when the beak is agape and throat tufts throbbing. Hill (2011) describes these apparent gaps in the song, but notes that the audio recording equipment used in the research was not capable of detecting ultrasound above a frequency of 22.1kHz. Tūī will also sing at night, especially around the full moon period.

Gallery

References

External links 

 Prosthemaderas Novæ Zealandiæ — (Tui or Parson Bird) From A History of the Birds of New Zealand by Walter Buller
 Tui – New Zealand native land birds Department of Conservation

Kiwi Wildlife tours Sound gallery (MP3 link) Comparison can be made with the bellbird song through this page.

Talking birds
Endemic birds of New Zealand
Meliphagidae
Birds of the Chatham Islands
Birds described in 1788
Fauna of the Auckland Islands
Articles containing video clips
Taxa named by Johann Friedrich Gmelin